Class Act is a British comedy-drama series produced by Verity Lambert. The series was broadcast by ITV, and ran for two series from 7 April 1994 to 19 October 1995. It starred Joanna Lumley, Nadine Garner, James Gaddas, Richard Vernon and John Bowe.

Episodes

Series One

"Episode 1" (7 April 1994); director: Jane Howell
"Episode 2" (14 April 1994); director: Jane Howell
"Episode 3" (21 April 1994); director: Herbert Wise
"Episode 4" (28 April 1994); director: Jane Howell
"Episode 5" (5 May 1994); director: James Cellan Jones
"Episode 6" (12 May 1994); director: James Cellan Jones
"Episode 7" (19 May 1994); director: Herbert Wise

Series Two

"Episode 1" (7 September 1995); director: Herbert Wise
"Episode 2" (14 September 1995); director: Herbert Wise
"Episode 3" (21 September 1995); director: Herbert Wise
"Episode 4" (28 September 1995); director: Rick Stroud
"Episode 5" (5 October 1995); director: Rick Stroud
"Episode 6" (12 October 1995); director: Rick Stroud
"Episode 7" (19 October 1995); director: Rick Stroud

DVD releases
The complete series of Class Act was released on DVD as a 4-disc box-set by the Network imprint on 2 August 2010.

External links
 
 

1994 British television series debuts
1995 British television series endings
1990s British comedy-drama television series
ITV television dramas
British comedy-drama television shows
Carlton Television
Television series produced at Pinewood Studios
Television series by ITV Studios
English-language television shows
Television shows set in England